Melon Collie and the Infinite Radness: Part One is a five-track EP released by Canadian indie group Tokyo Police Club on April 8, 2016. The band released the single "Not My Girl" on February 19, 2016, to promote the EP. The title of this EP (and it's successive Part Two) is a pun paying homage to the 1995 album Mellon Collie And The Infinite Sadness by The Smashing Pumpkins.

Track listing

Personnel 
Musicians

 Dave Monks – lead vocals, bass guitar, songwriting, producer
 Graham Wright – keyboards, guitar, air horn, songwriting
 Josh Hook – guitar, songwriting
 Greg Alsop – drums, songwriting
 Dave Bassett – songwriting (track: 2)
 Anne Douris – backing vocals (track: 2)
 Jon Drew – tambourine 
Technical

 Jon Drew – engineer

 Rob Schnapf – mixing
 Brian Rosemeyer – assistant mixing
 John DeBold – assistant mixing
 Mark Chalecki – mastering

Art

 Chris Shoonover – photography
 Todd Goldstein – artwork
 Hunter Devolin – layout

References 

Tokyo Police Club albums
2016 EPs